The 1974–75 season was the fifth season of the Portland Trail Blazers in the National Basketball Association (NBA).  After a 27–55 record the previous season, the Blazers earned the #1 pick in the 1974 NBA Draft, and made perhaps the most important selection in franchise history:  Hall of Famer Bill Walton out of UCLA.

In three years of varsity competition, Walton led UCLA to two NCAA championships and 88 consecutive wins, smashing the 60-game streak set by Bill Russell's teams at the University of San Francisco.  Walton also set UCLA's career assists record, which left observers declaring him the best passing center in the history of the game.

Injuries would limit Walton to just 35 games in his rookie year, but nevertheless the Blazers challenged for a playoff spot for the first time in franchise history. The Blazers fell just two games short with a 38–44 record.

Offseason

NBA Draft

Note:  This is not a complete list; only the first two rounds are covered, as well as any other picks by the franchise who played at least one NBA game.

Roster

Regular season

Season Standings

z – clinched division title
y – clinched division title
x – clinched playoff spot

Record vs. opponents

Awards and honors
 Sidney Wicks, NBA All-Star

References

External links
 Blazers on Database Basketball
 Blazers on Reference Basketball

Portland
Portland Trail Blazers seasons
Portland Trail Blazers 1974
Portland Trail Blazers 1974
Portland
Portland